Linköpings Fotboll Club is an association football club from Linköping, Sweden. The club was established in 2003 when Kenty DFF women's football club decided to merge with the premier division ice hockey club Linköpings HC under the new name Linköpings FC. The club's goal was both to establish women's football as a sport in Linköping and eventually become one of the top four teams.

History
In 2004, Linköpings FC finished their first year in the women's premier division (Damallsvenskan) in sixth place. The following two seasons the club reached its goal of finishing top four in the league with a fourth-place finish in 2005 and a third-place finish in 2006. The club also won Svenska Cupen ("The Swedish Cup") for the first time in 2006, defeating Umeå IK 3–2 in the cup final. They finished sixth in 2007 which was a failure for the club. In 2008 they led a long time through the series but still they finished second behind Swedish giants Umeå IK. Though, some consolation came when they won Svenska Cupen the same season, beating Umeå 1–0 in the final.

From 2004 to 2007 Linköpings FC increased their annual turnover from 2,4 million SEK to 5,0 million SEK. At the same time their average attendance dropped from 1,609 in the 2004 season to 997 in 2006. In 2007, Frida Östberg left the team after two years. Later, the team signed Jessica Landström after her debut for the national team. In February, they signed Brazilian internationals Cristiane and Daniela.

Current squad 

.

Former players
For details of current and former players, see :Category:Linköpings FC players.

Achievements 

 Damallsvenskan
 Winners (3): 2009, 2016, 2017
 Svenska Cupen:
 Winners (5): 2006, 2008, 2009, 2013–14, 2014–15

Record in UEFA Women's Champions League
All results (away, home and aggregate) list Linköping's goal tally first.

f First leg.

References

Footnotes

External links

 Linköpings FC – Official website 

 
Women's football clubs in Sweden
Football clubs in Östergötland County
2003 establishments in Sweden
Damallsvenskan teams
Association football clubs established in 2003